UFC on ESPN: Thompson vs. Holland (also known as UFC on ESPN 42) was a mixed martial arts event produced by the Ultimate Fighting Championship that took place on December 3, 2022, at Amway Center in Orlando, Florida, United States.

Background
The promotion has previously contested three events at Amway Center in Orlando, most recently in February 2018 for UFC on Fox: Emmett vs. Stephens.

A welterweight bout between former UFC Welterweight Championship challenger Stephen Thompson and Kevin Holland headlined the event.

Yazmin Jauregui and Istela Nunes met in a women's strawweight bout. They were originally booked to fight at UFC on ESPN: Vera vs. Cruz four months earlier, but Nunes withdrew due to injury.

A middleweight bout between Jack Hermansson and Derek Brunson was expected to take place at the event. However, Brunson withdrew due to an undisclosed injury and was replaced by Roman Dolidze.

A women's flyweight bout between Tracy Cortez and Amanda Ribas was expected to take place at the event. However, shortly after the official weigh-ins, the promotion announced Cortez was pulled from the bout due to an unspecified medical issue and the bout was cancelled.

At the weigh-ins, Philip Rowe weighed in at 173.5 pounds, two and a half pounds over the welterweight non-title fight limit. His bout proceeded at catchweight and he was  fined 30% of his purse, which went to his opponent Niko Price.

Results

Bonus awards 
The following fighters received $50,000 bonuses.
Fight of the Night: Stephen Thompson vs. Kevin Holland
Performance of the Night: Sergei Pavlovich and Roman Dolidze

Aftermath
With eight knockouts, this event tied the record with seven other events for most knockouts in a single UFC event in UFC history. Also, former UFC Lightweight Champion Rafael dos Anjos became the first fighter in UFC history to cross eight hours of octagon time.

See also 

 List of UFC events
 List of current UFC fighters
 2022 in UFC

References 

UFC on ESPN
2022 in mixed martial arts
Events in Orlando, Florida
December 2022 sports events in the United States